The 2019 Akwa Ibom State House of Assembly election was held on March 9, 2019, to elect members of the Akwa Ibom State House of Assembly in Nigeria. All the 26 seats were up for election in the Akwa Ibom State House of Assembly.

Aniekan Bassey from PDP representing Uruan constituency was elected Speaker, while Felicia Bassey from PDP representing Okobo constituency was elected Deputy Speaker.

Results 
The result of the election is listed below.

 Aniekan Uko from PDP won Ibesikpo Asutan constituency
 David Lawrence Udofa from PDP won Eket constituency
 Felicia Bassey from PDP won Okobo constituency
 Otuekong Nse Essien from PDP won Onna constituency
 Idongesit Ntekpere from PDP won Ikot Ekpene/Obot Akara constituency
 Uduak Odudoh from PDP won Ikot Abasi/Eastern Obolo constituency
 Emmanuel Ekpenyong Bassey from PDP won Ini constituency
 Aniefiok Dennis from PDP won Etinan constituency
 Usoro Akpanusoh from PDP won Esit Eket/Ibeno constituency
 Mark Esset from PDP won Nsit Atai constituency
 Effiong Okon Bassey from PDP won Oron/Udung Uko constituency
 Udo Kerian Akpan from PDP won Oruk Anam constituency
 Aniekan Bassey from PDP won Uruan constituency
 Asuquo E. Archibong from PDP won Urue Offong Oruko constituency
 Anietie B. Eka from PDP won Uyo constituency
 Otobong Effiong Bob from PDP won Nsit Ubium constituency
 Udeme J. Otong from PDP won Abak constituency
 Mfon Frank Idung from PDP won Etim Ekpo/Ika constituency
 Godwin James Ekpo from PDP won Ibiono Ibom constituency
 Asuquo Nana Udo from PDP won Ikono constituency
 Kufre-Abasi Edidem from PDP won Itu constituency
 Okon Asuquo Frank from PDP won Mbo constituency
 Victor Patrick Ekwere from PDP won Mkpat Enin constituency
 Ifiok Okon Udoh from PDP won Nsit Ibom constituency
 Charity Friday Ido from PDP won Ukanafun constituency
 Essien Udim from PDP won Esse Umoh constituency

References 

Akwa Ibom
2019 Akwa Ibom State elections